Zelenodolsk may refer to:
Zelenodolsk Urban Settlement, a municipal formation in Zelenodolsky Municipal District of the Republic of Tatarstan, Russia into which the town of republic significance of Zelenodolsk is incorporated
Zelenodolsk, Russia, several inhabited localities in Russia
Zelenodolsk, Ukraine, a city in Dnipropetrovsk Oblast, Ukraine

See also
Zelenodolsky (disambiguation)